Olulis puncticinctalis is a moth of the family Noctuidae first described by Francis Walker in 1863. It is found in Borneo, Peninsular Malaysia, the Andaman Islands, India, Sri Lanka, Taiwan and Japan.

References

Moths of Asia
Moths described in 1863